Tali Moreno (Hebrew: טלי מורנו; born 28 June 1981) is a news anchor and reporter in Kan 11 and formerly for Hadashot 13 in Israel. Moreno appears on Serves Shishi (a hosted television program) and Channel 13 News.

References

External links
http://www.ynet.co.il/articles/0,7340,L-3803337,00.html News story in Hebrew
http://celebs.nana10.co.il/Article/?ArticleID=671507 In Hebrew

1981 births
Living people
Israeli journalists
Israeli people of Romanian-Jewish descent
Israeli people of Moroccan-Jewish descent
Israeli television news anchors